Lake Idro (also Eridio from ,) is an Italian prealpine lake of glacial origin situated largely within the Province of Brescia (Lombardy) and in part in Trentino.

At 368 m above sea level it is the highest of the Lombard prealpine lakes. The lake is fed principally by the waters of the river Chiese; that river is also its only emissary. It has a surface area of 11.4 km² and a maximum depth of 122 m.

The lake is surrounded by wooded mountains. The shoreline of some 24 km is shared between four communes: Idro (the frazioni Crone and Lemprato), from which the lake takes its name, Anfo, Bagolino (fraz. Ponte Caffaro) and Bondone (fraz. Baitoni).

Lake Idro currently faces severe problems of eutrophication resulting from the absence of adequate sewerage systems and the use of its feed-waters for irrigation  and the generation of hydropower: it has become a site of conflict between environmental, agricultural and electricity industry interests.

The name derives from a legendary monster ( Idra ) who supposedly lived there

See also 
Italian Lakes
List of lakes of Italy

References
 http://www.ise.cnr.it/limno/schede/idro.htm
 Salviamo il lago d’idro 

Lakes of Lombardy
Lakes of Trentino-Alto Adige/Südtirol
Subalpine lakes of Italy
Waterways of Italy
Lakes of Trentino
Province of Brescia